The Willmar Stingers are a baseball team that plays in the Northwoods League, a collegiate summer baseball league. The Stingers played their inaugural season in 2010. The team plays its home games at Baker Field at Bill Taunton Stadium.

On June 3, 2010, the franchise's first ever hit and run were recorded by former Willmar Cardinal and current Cleveland Indians minor leaguer Jordan Smith.

The Stingers were honored with the Northwoods League Organization of the Year Award in 2010.  Stingers co-owner Marc Jerzak credited "Stingers fans, host families, sponsors and city officials" for "[making] the 2010 Inaugural season a memorable one."

Alumni in professional baseball
The Stingers have had 52 players either drafted or signed to free agent deals in the seven years of the franchise as of the 2016 season. Jacob Barnes became the first former Willmar Stingers player to make it to the Major League level when the right-handed pitcher was called up to the Milwaukee Brewers on June 1, 2016. Barnes made his MLB debut on June 3 against the Philadelphia Phillies, throwing a spotless frame with a pair of strikeouts.

The 2016 MLB season also saw a second former Stingers player make it to The Show, as Steven Brault made his MLB debut with the Pittsburgh Pirates on July 5 against the St. Louis Cardinals. Brault tossed four innings in a start against the Cardinals at Busch Stadium, yielding just one earned run with five strikeouts.

 Forrestt Allday, Boston Red Sox 
 Isaac Ballou, Washington Nationals 
 Jacob Barnes, Milwaukee Brewers 
 Carter Bell, Arizona Diamondbacks 
 Anthony Bemboom, Los Angeles Angels 
 Steven Brault, Baltimore Orioles 
 Jack Cleary, Milwaukee Brewers 
 Mitch Delfino, San Francisco Giants 
 Hunter Dozier, Kansas City Royals 2013 first-round pick
 Sean Dwyer, Colorado Rockies 
 Dillon Haupt, Chicago White Sox 
 Max Homick, Baltimore Orioles 
 Ricky Knapp, New York Mets 
 Jason Leblebijian, Toronto Blue Jays 
 Scott Lieser, Milwaukee Brewers 
 Jerad McCrummen, Colorado Rockies 
 Mikey Reynolds, Atlanta Braves 
 Joe Sever, Cleveland Indians 
 Jordan Smith, Cleveland Indians 
 Kurt Spomer, Los Angeles Angels 
 Pat Stover, Los Angeles Dodgers 
 Thomas Taylor, Los Angeles Dodgers 
 Andre Wheeler, Chicago White Sox

References

External links
 Willmar Stingers - official site
 Northwoods League - official site

Northwoods League teams
Amateur baseball teams in Minnesota
Willmar, Minnesota
2010 establishments in Minnesota
Baseball teams established in 2010